Chris Riley (born 19 August 1964) is a New Zealand footballer who represented New Zealand.

Riley made his full All Whites debut in a 1-2 loss to Australia on 12 October 1988 and ended his international playing career with 16 A-international caps to his credit, his final cap being in a 0-3 loss to Australia on 6 June 1993.

References

External links

1964 births
Living people
New Zealand association footballers
New Zealand international footballers
Association football midfielders